The Cleansing Hour is a 2019 horror film directed by Damien LeVeck about a staged televised exorcism that takes a nefarious turn. 

The movie is a feature length adaptation of a short film by the same name that LeVeck released in 2016.

Synopsis
Childhood friends Max and Drew host The Cleansing Hour, a popular livestream show where "Father Max" exorcises a possessed person during each episode. In reality each possession is fake, as they are carefully scripted and orchestrated to entice viewers to like and follow their videos and purchase goods. Max is obsessed with drawing as large a crowd as possible and gaining a bigger following. Drew's fiancée Lane is unhappy but supportive, even going so far as to agree to step in as the possessed person when the actor Derek, for their current episode, doesn't show.

As the stream starts, it becomes clear that Lane has become truly possessed. The demon kills many of the crew members one by one, eventually leaving just Drew and Max alive. She also forces both of them to fess up to every secret he has hidden away. This begins with Max confessing that the show is fake, but as the stream continues he confesses to accidentally murdering a nun while he was a schoolboy. Both he and Drew attended the same Catholic school as children, where they were frequently beaten by a sadistic nun while she castigated them for real or imagined sins. During one particularly bad beating Max killed her in order to save Drew, an experience that scarred and followed him throughout his entire life. He also confesses that he was once a priest, but that he left after witnessing the various abuses of the Catholic priesthood that remained unchecked and unpunished. He then launched the show, thinking that it wouldn't hurt anyone.

As the viewer count rises, Drew realizes that the demon is using the stream for its own purposes and cuts the feed, assuming that its desire is to humiliate the Catholic church. He reconnects the feed after identifying the demon as Aamon using various hints in its speech throughout the stream on a database. The demon then forces one final revelation, that Max and Lane had previously slept together prior to her meeting Drew. This truth almost derails everything, but the rising viewer count causes them to remember to perform the exorcism rites. The demon is driven from Lane, however the entire process has left Max and Drew's friendship shattered. This tenuous peace is short lived, as the demon re-appears in front of the trio to reveal that it tricked them. It was never Aamon, but Lucifer himself, and it possessed Lane in order to gain access to the stream and possess all of the current watchers, which now numbers over 17,000,000 million. The possessed viewers attack everyone around them, including the President of the United States by his son, one of the many viewers.

The end credits show all the mayhem caused by the possessed around the world.

Cast 
 Ryan Guzman as Max
 Kyle Gallner as Drew
 Alix Angelis as Lane
 Chris Lew Kum Hoi as Chris
 Daniel Hoffmann-Gill as Tommy
 Emma Holzer as Riley
 Joanna David as Schoolmarm
 Ionut Grama as Humberto 
 Tara Karsian as Voice of possessed Lane
 Jynarra Brinson as Desiree
 Ana Udroiu as Brenda
 Aaron McVeigh as Young Drew
 Lucas Bond as Young Max

Release
The Cleansing Hour first screened at the Strasbourg European Fantastic Film Festival on September 18, 2019, followed by its official world premiere at Fantastic Fest the next day. The movie went on to screen at several film festivals, including its UK premiere at FrightFest on March 6, 2020.

The film was released to streaming service Shudder in 2020.

Reception
Common praise for the film centered on the film's cinematography and the practical effects. Outlets such as Bloody Disgusting, SciFiNow, and Rue Morgue criticized the movie as not bringing enough novel elements to make it stand out from other, similar possession films such as The Exorcist.

References

External links
 

2019 horror films
Demons in film
Features based on short films
Shudder (streaming service) original programming